East Columbus may refer to:

East Columbus, Ohio
East Columbus, Georgia
East Columbus, Indiana